The Red Rock River may refer to: 

Red Rock River (Montana), US
Red Rock River (New South Wales) in New South Wales, Australia
Red Rock River (Ontario) in Ontario, Canada
Red Rock River (Kokang) in Kokang Special Region, Burma